Pendroy is an unincorporated hamlet in Teton County, Montana, United States. There is a reservations-only bar and restaurant there, a small grocery, and the post office serving ZIP code 59467; but no other stores, gas service or travelers' lodgings.

Established with the construction of the Great Northern Railway, the town boasted a depot, roundhouse, and section house by 1916. It is named for nearby homesteader Levi "Boots" Pendroy, friend of railway founder James J. Hill.

Demographics

Notes

Unincorporated communities in Teton County, Montana
Unincorporated communities in Montana